Hernán Fernández (17 March 1921 – 5 July 2010) was a Chilean footballer. He played in ten matches for the Chile national football team from 1942 to 1952. He was also part of Chile's squad for the 1942 South American Championship.

References

External links
 
 

1921 births
2010 deaths
Chilean footballers
Chile international footballers
Place of birth missing
Association football goalkeepers
Unión Española footballers
Santiago Morning footballers